Theodor Innitzer (25 December 1875  – 9 October 1955) was Archbishop of Vienna and a cardinal of the Catholic Church.

Early life
Innitzer was born in Neugeschrei (Nové Zvolání), part of the town Weipert (Vejprty) in Bohemia, at that time Austria-Hungary, (now Czech Republic). He was the son of a passementier Wilhelm Innitzer in Vejprty, House Nr. 362, later a textile factory worker, and his wife Maria born Seidl, daughter of a mining clerk. After completing the minimum mandatory school, Innitzer became an apprentice in a textile factory. The dean of his home parish supported the young Theodor, which allowed him to attend a gymnasium (1890–1892 Communal-Gymnasium), and Staatsgymnasium (1892–1898) in Kaaden (Kadaň).

Ecclesiastical career

1898 – entered the seminary in Vienna
1902 – became a priest
1906 – received his Dr. theol. (Doctorate in Theology)
1908 to 1911 Privatdozent at the University of Vienna
1911 to 1932 professor and (from 1913) Chair for New Testament Exegesis
1928 to 1929 Rector of the University of Vienna
1929 to 1930 Minister of Social Affairs in the third government of Chancellor Johann Schober
1932 Archbishop of Vienna
1933 Cardinal, Founded the Cathedral and Diocesan Museum of Vienna

Political activity and assessment

The Anschluss
Innitzer's role in early 20th century Austrian history remains disputed, because of his involvement in politics. Despite being intimidated into supporting the Anschluss after being assaulted by Nazi supporters, Innitzer became a critic of the Nazis and was subject to further violent intimidation from them.

This assessment stems from his cooperation with the Austro-fascist government of Engelbert Dollfuß and Kurt Schuschnigg from 1934 to 1938, which based many of its economic and social policies on the teachings of the Catholic Church. He and the other Austrian Catholic bishops signed a declaration endorsing the Anschluss, set up by Gauleiter Josef Bürckel, and signed by Innitzer with "Heil Hitler!". Without the bishops' consent the Nazi regime disseminated this statement throughout the German Reich. Upon hearing of this act, Pope Pius XI ordered Cardinal Innitzer to sign a clarification, which was then published in L'Osservatore Romano.

Vatican Radio had recently broadcast a vehement denunciation of the Nazi action, and Cardinal Pacelli (soon to become Pope Pius XII) ordered Innitzer to report to the Vatican. Before meeting with Pius XI, Innitzer met with Pacelli, who had been outraged by Innitzer's statement. He made it clear that Innitzer needed to retract and was made to sign a new statement, issued on behalf of all the Austrian bishops, which provided: "The solemn declaration of the Austrian bishops... was clearly not intended to be an approval of something that was not and is not compatible with God's law". The Vatican newspaper also reported that the bishops' earlier statement had been issued without the approval of the Holy See, with the fairly neutral Pope Pius XI disagreeing totally with Innitzer.

Nazi intimidation
In April 1938, in honour of Hitler's birthday, Cardinal Innitzer had ordered that all Austrian churches fly the swastika flag, ring bells, and pray for Hitler. Despite this Innitzer called a day of prayer in the Cathedral of St. Stephen of Vienna for 7 October 1938, which was attended by almost 9,000 parishioners, mostly young people. In the sermon Innitzer declared that "we must confess our faith in our Führer, for there is just one Führer: Jesus Christ", which greatly angered the Nazi leaders: about 100 Nazis, among them many older members of the Hitler Youth, ransacked the archbishop's residence the very next day. In Britain, the Catholic Herald provided the following contemporary account on 14 October 1938:

World War II
Innitzer's ambiguous relationship with the Nazi regime brought him a lot of criticism after World War II (he was referred to as the "Heil Hitler Cardinal"). During the War Innitzer was critical of the anti-Semitic and racist policies of the Nazis towards the Austrian Jews and also the Catholic gypsies of the Austrian countryside.

He openly, though moderately, supported the war effort against the Soviet Union, however. Years before, he had campaigned against Soviet policies. In 1933, based on data collected by undercover investigation and photographs, Innitzer sought to raise awareness in the West of the many deaths by hunger and even cases of cannibalism that were occurring in Ukraine and the North Caucasus at that time.

In October 1944 Innitzer preached in the parish of Vienna-Reindorf, which also included members of the NSDAP local group who listened and wrote a report about it. In their report, they criticized that Innitzer's speech was "cleverly demoralized". Thereby, statements like the following are thought: “You don't know what will come. It is possible that Vienna will also become a theater of war.” However, Innitzer attributed the war to God directly; he saw it as a punishment for misconduct by the people. Innitzer also expressed his regret for the low participation in church life: children grow up without Communion and confession, have no religious instruction at school, there are no more seminaries, and only one sixth of the Catholics go to Holy Mass.  Such indications can also be understood as indirect criticism of the National Socialist government, since their measures have suppressed the church's influence.

Writings 

 John the Baptist. Illustrated according to the scriptures and tradition. by Theodor Innitzer. Mayer, Vienna 1908.
 Commentary on the Gospel of Healing Luke excluding the story of suffering. (Revised by Franz Xaver Pölzl. 2nd edition, especially by Theodor Innitzer.) Graz u. Vienna 1912.
 Court Councilor Dr. Ms. X. Pölzl. Styria , Graz 1915.
 Commentary on the Gospel of St. Mark excluding the history of suffering. (Founded by Franz Xaver Pölzl. 3rd revised edition, especially by Theodor Innitzer.) Graz u. Vienna 1916.
 Brief commentary on the four holy gospels. (Founded by Franz Xaver Poelzl continued by Theodor Innitzer. 4 verb. Edition) Graz 1928.
 The religion of the earth in detail. (Together with Fritz Wilke.) Leipzig u. Vienna 1929.
 The Holy Year and Peace. In: Hermann Hoffmann: The Church and Peace. 1,933th
 He is risen! Pictures by Josef von Führich. Statement by Theodor Innitzer. Bernina, Vienna 1949.
 Faith letter. Herder, Vienna 1939–40
 What are we doing ourselves? Cardinal Archbishop Theodor Innitzer u. Archbishop coadjutor Franz Jachym call for help f. young families. Catholic family work of the Archdiocese of Vienna, Vienna 1951.

Death
Theodor Cardinal Innitzer died in Vienna, Austria on 9 October 1955.

Kardinal Innitzer Prize
The Archdiocese of Vienna annually awards the Kardinal-Innitzer-Preis to scientists and scholars, which is named in honor of Innitzer.

Cultural references
In the 1963 movie The Cardinal, Innitzer was played by Josef Meinrad in scenes interpreting the events of the Anschluss including the statement and the sacking of the residence.

See also

List of Austrians
List of Austrian Politicians

References

External links 
 Speech by Innitzer in 1933
 

1875 births
1955 deaths
People from Vejprty
German Bohemian people
20th-century Austrian cardinals
Archbishops of Vienna
Academic staff of the University of Vienna
Pope Pius XI
Pope Pius XII
Austrian people of World War II
Austrian people of German Bohemian descent
Government ministers of Austria